Papedeh (also Romanized as Pāpedeh and Pāpadeh; also known as Jūrī Rahdār and Pābadeh) is a village in Howmeh Rural District, in the Central District of Bam County, Kerman Province, Iran. At the 2006 census, its population was 21, in 5 families.

References 

Populated places in Bam County